Cuarte de Huerva is a municipality located in the province of Zaragoza, Aragon, Spain. According to the 2013 census the municipality has a population of 11043 inhabitants.

It is named after the Huerva River.

See also
Zaragoza Comarca
List of municipalities in Zaragoza

References

 INE

External links 

Municipalities in the Province of Zaragoza